Henrique Sallaty (c. 1919 – 2007) was a Portuguese sailor. He competed in the Dragon event at the 1948 Summer Olympics.

References

External links
 

Year of birth uncertain
2007 deaths
Portuguese male sailors (sport)
Olympic sailors of Portugal
Sailors at the 1948 Summer Olympics – Dragon
Place of birth missing